Stylianos may refer to:

 Stylianos of Paphlagonia (fl. late 6th century), patron saint of children
 Stylianos Zaoutzes (died 899), Byzantine official and father-in-law of emperor Leo VI
 Stylianos Gonatas (1876-1966), Greek general and politician, Prime Minister of Greece 1922-1924
 Stylianos Miliadis (1881-1965), Greek painter
 Stylianos Mavromichalis (1902-1981), Greek politician
 Stylianos Kyriakides (1910-1987), Greek Cypriot runner
 Stylianos Pattakos (1912-2016), Greek Army officer, one of the leaders of the Greek military junta of 1967–1974
 Archbishop Stylianos of Australia (1935–2019)
 Stylianos Lenas (died 1957), Cypriot EOKA fighter
 Stylianos Kalfelis (born 1950), Greek general
 Stylianos Giannakopoulos (born 1974), Greek footballer

See also 
 Stelios (disambiguation), the diminutive form of the name

Greek masculine given names